Cortlandt station is a commuter rail stop on the Metro-North Railroad's Hudson Line, located in  Montrose, New York. Trains leave for New York City every hour on weekdays, and about every 25 minutes during rush hour.

History 
Cortlandt is the second newest station on the Hudson Line (and seventh-newest on the Metro-North system). The station replaced the low-level Montrose and Crugers stations at a point midway between them on June 30, 1996. Those stations were replaced as part of the last stage of expanding the Hudson Line to six-car high-level platforms. They could not be extended because of the curvature of their platforms. Cortlandt is the first station north of Croton–Harmon, where electrification begins southbound.

On February 15, 2012, Metro-North completed the expansion project of the station. The new facility includes an overpass extension that ties the original station east of the tracks with a new entrance on the west side off NY 9A, new parking and a landscaped, canopy-covered, intermodal drop-off plaza. The new overpass has a spacious, heated waiting area with numerous benches and a coffee concession.

Station layout
The station has one six-car-long high-level island platform.

References

Further reading

External links 

 Entrance from Google Maps Street View

Metro-North Railroad stations in New York (state)
Railway stations in Westchester County, New York
Railway stations in the United States opened in 1996
1996 establishments in New York (state)